The Czech Women's Volleyball Extraliga is a women's volleyball competition organized by the Czech Volleyball Association (Český volejbalový svaz, ČVS). It was created in 1992, just after the dissolution of Czechoslovakia.

Names History 
Extraliga žen (1992–2005)
ArginMax Extraliga žen (2005–2007)
Extraliga žen (2007–2010)
UNIQA Extraliga žen (2010–...)

List of Champions

Table by clubs

References

External links
Czech Volleyball Association
 Czech Republic Extraliga. women.volleybox.net 

Czech Republic
Volleyball in the Czech Republic
Czech Extraliga
Professional sports leagues in the Czech Republic